Kirk Ebanks (born 23 July 1968) is a Jamaican cricketer. He played in four first-class matches for the Jamaican cricket team in 1991/92 and 1992/93.

See also
 List of Jamaican representative cricketers

References

External links
 

1968 births
Living people
Jamaican cricketers
Jamaica cricketers